The Norfolk Tars were a minor league baseball team that existed on and off from 1906 to 1955. Based in Norfolk, Virginia, they played in the Virginia League from 1906 to 1918 and from 1921 to 1928, in the Eastern League from 1931 to 1932 and in the Piedmont League from 1934 to 1955, and from 1934 to 1955 they were affiliated with the New York Yankees. Their home field was Bain Field and from 1940 to 1955, it was Myers Field. The ballclub folded after playing its final game on July 13, 1955, an 11–3 victory over the Sunbury Redlegs before a crowd of 851. The 1952 Tars were recognized as one of the 100 greatest minor league teams of all time.

Year-by-year record

References

Baseball teams established in 1906
Defunct Eastern League (1938–present) teams
Defunct baseball teams in Virginia
New York Yankees minor league affiliates
1906 establishments in Virginia
1955 disestablishments in Virginia
Baseball teams disestablished in 1955
Piedmont League teams
Virginia League teams